William Snodgrass (4 September 1827 – 22 July 1906) was a Canadian Presbyterian minister and the sixth Principal of Queen's College, now Queen's University.

Under his tenure, the position of chancellor and the university council were created, the Queen's Journal released its first issue, and Queen's was yet again saved from financial ruin through an aggressive and very successful fundraising campaign.

External links 
 Biography at The Dictionary of Canadian Biography Online

1827 births
1906 deaths
Canadian Christian religious leaders
Canadian educators
Principals of Queen's University at Kingston
Canadian Presbyterian ministers